Hinduism is a minority religion in the Netherlands, representing about 1.0% of the Dutch population in 2019. After the United Kingdom and Italy, the third largest Hindu community of Europe lives in the Netherlands. There are between 150,000 – 200,000 Hindus currently living in the Netherlands, the vast majority of who migrated from Suriname – a former Dutch colony in South America. There are also sizable populations of Hindu immigrants from India, Sri Lanka and Afghanistan, as well as a smaller number of Western adherents of Hinduism-oriented new religious movements.

History
The presence of a significant number of Hindus in the Netherlands is a relatively modern development; in 1960, it is estimated there were only ten Indian families in the country, who between them presumably comprised the bulk of the Hindu population. In 1971, the Centraal Bureau voor de Statistiek (CBS) recorded around 3,000 adherents. In the 1970s, however, the number sharply increased. This was due to the immigration of the Indo-Surinamese ("Hindustanis"), people of Indian origin whose families had emigrated to Suriname as indentured workers in the late nineteenth century. With Surinamese independence in 1975, growing concern about their future in the new country caused about a third of the Hindustani population to leave Surinam and emigrate to the Netherlands. The Indo-Surinamese were predominantly Hindu, and as a result the Hindu population increased tenfold over the decade to 34,000 in 1980, continuing to climb to 61,000 in 1990 and 91,000 in 2000.

Demographics

The changes in Hindu population from 2010-19.

The largest group of Hindus in the Netherlands is composed of immigrants, mainly from Suriname but with numbers also directly from India and Sri Lanka. 
The estimated number of Hindus can vary dramatically depending on which source is used, ranging from 100,000 to comfortably over 200,000. A 1997 study suggested that there were around 100,000 adherents. A 2006 estimate by the CBS concurred with this number, breaking it down as 83,000 of Surinamese origin, 11,000 of Indian origin, 5,000 other non-Europeans, and 1,000 Europeans. However, the Hindu Council of the Netherlands estimated around 215,000, of which 160,000 were from Surinam, 15,000 from the Indian subcontinent, and 40,000 from elsewhere. This figure tallies very closely with those put out by the High Level Committee on the Indian Diaspora, who stated that the Netherlands had 200,000 people of Indian origin, and 15,000 Non-Resident Indians; it is not clear if the two figures have a common source or if they are simply conflating people of ethnic Indian background with practising Hindus.

A 2003 study gave the total Indo-Surinamese population - Surinamese originally of Indian descent - as 160,000, of which 80%, or around 130,000, were Hindu. The largest regional populations, according to the 2003 study, were in South Holland (60,000), mostly clustered around The Hague, and North Holland (31,200); between them, the two provinces accounted for over 70% of the overall population.  The same study suggested that there were around fifty temples and around 250 priests, of whom half were full-time workers.

The percentage of Hindus by provinces in Netherland:

Hindu Denominations

The bulk of this population, around 80%, belong to the Sanatana dharma, whilst the remaining 20% belong to the sectarian Arya Samaj movement. There are other groups belonging to the more recent "guru movements", such as the Hare Krishnas or the Transcendental Meditation movement, and finally a small number who practice a mixture of more "new age" or theosophical beliefs which include elements linked to Hinduism.

Hinduism in Oversea territory of Netherlands

Sint Maarten
Hinduism is practised by 5.2% of the population of Sint Maarten. Hindus are represented by the St. Maarten Hindu Organization, which holds regular satsangs (prayers) in the Sun Building every first and third Sunday of every month.

Curaçao
Hinduism is a minority religion in Curaçao. There is a large Hindu temple in Willemstad, capital of Curaçao.

Community
Although still considered a minority religion in the Netherlands, Hinduism is much better organized there, than in other western countries such as the United Kingdom and the United States.

There are five Hindu schools funded by the Hindu community in the country, which are deemed as national schools. The schools follow the same curriculum as other schools. The curriculum also includes Hindi, teaching of the Hindu epics such as Ramayana and Mahabharata, and celebrating Hindu festivals,

The Hindus have also established their own Human Rights group called ‘Agni’, in order to address the grievances of the community and to highlight the atrocities that are sometimes encountered by them.
Besides hosting their own radio program, the Hindu community also used to broadcast its own 30 minute weekly program, ‘Ohm’, on the national television.
They also have their own charity called ‘Seva Netverk’, to help people .

There are many cultural platforms and societies that try to maintain the Hindu culture in the Netherlands, such as Saraswati Art and Hindorama.

Controversy
In 2019, there was a controversy due to the inappropriate portrayal of Lord Ganesh Beer bottle. Rajan Zed, president of Universal Society of Hinduism said that Lord Ganesh was highly revered in Hinduism and he was meant to be worshipped in temples or home shrines and not to be used in selling beer. Moreover, linking a deity with an alcoholic beverage was very disrespectful, Zed added.

Literature
Freek L. Bakker, Hindus in the Netherlands, Berlin: LIT Verlag 2018.

See also
Hindu denominations
Hinduism in Suriname
Persecution of Hindus
List of Hindu temples in the Netherlands
Hinduism in Guadeloupe

Notes

References

Dutch language
 Geloven in het publieke domein: verkenningen van een dubbele transformatie. W.B.H.J. van de Donk, A.P. Jonkers, G.J. Kronjee en R.J.J. Plum. 2006. 
 Bevolking; Islamieten en hindoes in Nederland. CBS StatLine

English language
Chapter 11, Other Countries of Europe. Report of the High Level Committee on the Indian Diaspora.

External links